The 2021 Solgironès Open Catalunya was a professional women's tennis tournament played on outdoor clay courts. It was the fifth edition of the tournament which was part of the 2021 ITF Women's World Tennis Tour. It took place in La Bisbal d'Empordà, Spain between 10 and 16 May 2021.

Singles main-draw entrants

Seeds

 1 Rankings are as of 26 April 2021.

Other entrants
The following players received wildcards into the singles main draw:
  Marta Custic
  Victoria Jiménez Kasintseva
  Francesca Jones
  Ane Mintegi del Olmo

The following player received entry using a protected ranking:
  Irina Khromacheva

The following players received entry from the qualifying draw:
  Marina Bassols Ribera
  Cristiana Ferrando
  Guiomar Maristany
  Tereza Mrdeža
  Jessica Pieri
  Andreea Prisăcariu
  Olga Sáez Larra
  Simona Waltert

Champions

Singles

 Irina Khromacheva def.  Arantxa Rus, 6–4, 1–6, 7–6(10–8)

Doubles

  Valentina Ivakhnenko /  Andreea Prisăcariu def.  Mona Barthel /  Mandy Minella, 6–3, 6–1

References

External links
 2021 Solgironès Open Catalunya at ITFtennis.com
 Official website

2021 ITF Women's World Tennis Tour
2021 in Spanish tennis
May 2021 sports events in Spain